Amanita battarrae, also known as the grey-zoned ringless amanita, is a species of Amanita in Italy in the fall.

References

External links
 
 

battarrae